37th Street may mean:

Streets
37th Street (Austin)
37th Street (Manhattan)
37th Street (Savannah), a street forming part of Georgia State Route 204

Transportation
37th Street/USC station, a bus station in Los Angeles, California
 37th Street station (SEPTA), a SEPTA trolley station in Philadelphia, Pennsylvania